Hockenhull is a surname. Notable people with the surname include:

Andrew W. Hockenhull, American politician
Georgina Hockenhull, British gymnast
James Hockenhull, British army officer
Ross Hockenhull, British racing driver
Thomas Hockenhull, English rugby player

See also
Hockenhull